Joseph Paterson (27 December 1923 — 10 January 1992) was a Scottish first-class cricketer and administrator.

Paterson was born in December 1923 at Coatbridge and was educated in the town at Coatbridge High School. A club cricketer for Drumpellier Cricket Club, Paterson made a single appearance in first-class cricket for Scotland against Yorkshire at Hull on Scotland's 1956 tour of England. Batting twice in the match as a middle order batsman, he was dismissed in the Scottish first innings without scoring by Johnny Wardle, while in their second innings he was dismissed for a single run by the same bowler. Paterson later served as the president of the Scottish Cricket Union in 1980. Outside of cricket, Paterson was a work study superintendent by profession. He died at Coatbridge in January 1992.

References

External links
 

1923 births
1992 deaths
Sportspeople from Coatbridge
People educated at Coatbridge High School
Scottish cricketers
Scottish cricket administrators